Estonia competed at the 2022 World Athletics Championships in Eugene, Oregon, United States, from 15 to 24 July 2022. Estonia entered 5 athletes.

Results

Men
Track and road events

Combined events – Decathlon

Women
Field events

References

Nations at the 2022 World Athletics Championships
World Championships in Athletics
2022